Manzhouli Xijiao Airport  is an airport serving Manzhouli, a city in the autonomous region of Inner Mongolia in the People's Republic of China.

Airlines and destinations

See also
 List of airports in China

References

Airports in Inner Mongolia
Hulunbuir
Airports established in 2004